The term Uttarāyaṇa (commonly Uttarayan) is derived from two different Sanskrit words – "uttara" (North) and "ayana" (movement) – thus indicating a semantic of the northward movement of the Sun on the celestial sphere. This movement begins to occur a day after the winter solstice in December, which occurs around 22 December and continues for a six-month period through to the summer solstice around June 21 (dates vary). This difference is because the solstices continually precess at a rate of 50 arcseconds per year due to the precession of the equinoxes, i.e. this difference is the difference between the sidereal and tropical zodiacs. The Surya Siddhanta bridges this difference by juxtaposing the four solstitial and equinoctial points with four of the twelve boundaries of the rashis.

The complement of Uttarayana is Dakshinayana, i.e. the period between Karka sankranti and Makara Sankranti as per the sidereal zodiac and between the Summer solstice and Winter solstice as per the tropical zodiac.

Difference between Uttarayana and Makar Sankranti 
There is a common misconception that Makar Sankranti marks the beginning of Uttarayana. This is because at one point in time Sayana and Nirayana zodiac were the same. Every year sidereal and tropical equinoxes slide by 50 seconds due to axial precession, giving birth to Ayanamsha and causing Makar Sankranti to slide further.  When equinox slides it will increase ayanamsha and Makar Sankranti will also slide. This misconception continues as there is not much difference between actual Uttarayana date which occurs a day after winter solstice (of Dec 21) when the sun makes the northward journey, and 14 January.  However, the difference will be significant as equinoxes slide further. In 272 AD, Makar Sankranti was on 21 December. In 1000 AD, Makar Sankranti was on 31 December and now it falls on January 14. After 9000 years, Makar Sankranti will be in June. Then Makar Sankranti would mark the beginning of Dakshinayana. However Makar Sankranti still holds importance in Hindu rituals. All Drika Panchanga makers like mypanchang.com, datepanchang, janmabhumi panchang, rashtriya panchang  and Vishuddha Siddhanta Panjika use the position of the tropical sun to determine Uttarayana and Dakshinayana.

Uttarayana in various treatises

Surya Siddhanta 

Mayasura, the composer of Surya Siddhanta, defines Uttarayana, at the time of composition, as the period between the Makara Sankranti (which currently occurs around January 14) and Karka Sankranti (which currently occurs around July 16). Lātadeva describes this as half revolutions of the Sun, using the terms Uttarayana and Dakshinayana to describe the "northern and southern progress" respectively.  Bal Gangadhar Tilak, a scholar and mathematician, proposes an alternative, early vedic definition of Uttarayana as starting from Vernal Equinox and ending with Autumnal Equinox. This definition interprets the term "Uttara Ayana" as "northern movement" instead of "northward movement", i.e. as the movement of the Earth in the region North of the Equator. In support of this proposal, he points to another tradition that the Uttarayana is considered the daytime of the Gods residing at the North Pole which tradition makes sense only if we define Uttarayana as the period between the Vernal and Autumnal equinoxes (when there is Midnight Sun at the North Pole). Conversely, Dakshinaya is defined as the period between the Autumnal and Vernal Equinoxes, when there is midnight sun at the South Pole. This period is also referred to as Pitrayana (with the Pitrus (i.e. ancestors) being placed at the South Pole).

Drik Siddhanta 

This festival is currently celebrated on the 14th or 15th of January but due to axial precession of the earth it will continue to shift away from the actual season. The season occurs based on tropical sun (without ayanamsha). The earth revolves around sun with a tilt of 23.44 degrees. When the tilt is facing the sun we get summer and when the tilt is away from the sun we get winter. That is the reason when there is summer north of the equator, it will be winter south of the equator. Because of this tilt, the sun appears to travel north and south of the equator. This motion of the sun transitioning from south to north is called Uttarayana (the sun is moving towards north). Once the sun reaches north, it begins moving south and is called Dakshinayana – the sun is moving towards south. This causes seasons which are dependent on equinoxes and solstices.

Hindu Scriptures 
Uttarayana is referred to as the day of new good healthy wealthy beginning. According to Kauravas and Pandavas, in Mahabharata on this day Bheeshma Pitamaha, chose to leave for his heavenly abode. As per the boon granted to Devavrata (young Bheeshma), he could choose his time of death so, he chose this day, when the sun starts on its course towards the northern hemisphere. According to Hindu scripture, Bhagavad Gita, those who die when the sun is on its northward course (from south to north) attain nirvana.  This explains the choice made by Devavrata to wait until Uttarayana to die.

According to the Hindu tradition the six months of Uttarayana are a single day of the Gods; the six months of Dakshinayana are a single night of the Gods. Thus a year of twelve months is single Nychthemeron of the Gods. This refers to the six months of single day at the North pole and concurrent six months of night at the south pole.

References

External links

 Animated illustration of Uttarayana and Dakshinayana

Hindu astronomy
Hindu calendar
Articles containing video clips